Helleria brevicornis, the sole species of the monotypic genus Helleria, is a terrestrial woodlouse endemic to the islands and coastal regions of the northern Tyrrhenian sea. H. brevicornis is of interest due to its endemism, unique ecology and basal position in the suborder Oniscidea.

Description
This species has vestigial antennules, short antennae and a trapezoid telson. Each of its compound eyes consist of 19 ommatidia. Juveniles have bumps and setae while adults are almost smooth with light spots. In adults the plates of the posterior (pleonites) fuse with each other after moulting. Like all other members of the family Tylidae, it is capable of rolling up into a perfect ball with antennas tucked in.

Distribution
Records of this species at Genoa and at Ospedaletti are uncorroborated. A molecular phylogenetic analysis found that the colonisation of the French and Italian mainland and of the Tuscan Archipelago occurred most recently but failed to conclusively determine whether the distribution was caused by climate change during the Late Pleistocene period or through accidental human transportation of the species.

Ecology
It is found living in large subsocial groups and is known to engage in conspecific coprophagy. Like other peracarids, females of H. brevicornis provide developing embryos with water, oxygen and nutrients through a specialised structure known as the marsupium. They are semelparous, breeding only once in their lifetime. Its hindgut is host to the mesomycetozoean parasite Eccrinoides helleriae.

Mate guarding
H. brevicornis has followed a unique evolutionary path among terrestrial isopods, and is the only fully terrestrial isopod that has retained the ancestral behaviour of mate guarding which has been observed in all aquatic isopods and some supralittoral species of the genus Ligia. This may have been selected for because these woodlice are semelparous and females lack seminal receptacles. During the breeding period, a male will guard a female who is about to become sexually receptive by riding on top of and tightly gripping her. This precopulatory mate guarding begins 1 to 20 days before the parturial moult of the female. Copulation occurs within 5 to 12 hours after the female sheds the posterior part of her exoskeleton. The male continues the 'nuptial ride' after mating and stops when the female lays fertilised eggs in her newly formed marsupium.

Taxonomic history
The genus Helleria and type species Helleria brevicornis were first described by Dr. Victor von Ebner, in a publication dated 8 January 1868, from a specimen collected in Corsica. He named the genus Helleria after his friend Camill Heller, who was known for his work on crustacean anatomy, and the specific epithet brevicornis after the Latin for 'short-horned' in reference to the woodlouse's short antennae. Later that year, in a journal published in December, Rev. Alfred Norman described a new genus of amphipods which he also named Helleria, which would eventually be renamed Guernea. In 1879 Gustav Budde-Lund declared Helleria brevicornis a junior synonym to Syspastus brevicornis, a name which he popularised in his seminal 1885 catalog of terrestrial isopods. Meanwhile, Achille Costa had named a woodlouse he found in Sardinia in 1882 Synlomagaster dasypus and subsequently Syngastron dasypus in 1883 but subsequent investigation showed it to be the same as H. brevicornis. While other authors had previously pointed out the precedence of von Ebner's publication, an 1893 book by Rev. Thomas Stebbings ensured subsequent authors (with the notable exception of Karl Verhoeff) used Helleria brevicornis Ebner to describe this woodlouse.

Since it was first described, some authors had placed Helleria and Tylos in the same family while others had separated them into two different families. The current taxonomy of placing the two genera in the family Tylidae has persisted since 1960 with Albert Vandel's publication of Isopodes terrestres.

References

External links
 
 Image gallery of H. brevicornis at Trilobite.ch; key image(s): photo of underside.
 Image gallery of H. brevicornis at insecte.org (in French); key image(s): macro photo of juvenile. 
 Macro photos of H. brevicornis on MyrmecoFourmis.fr (in French); key image(s): photos of conglobation.
 Image gallery of H. brevicornis at fansite (in French); key image(s): photos of fused pleonites & trapezoid telson and mancae emerging from marsupium.

Woodlice
Woodlice of Europe
Crustaceans described in 1868